Rik Barnett (born 20 March 1990, in Macclesfield) is an English actor, and the 2010 winner of the best supporting actor award from Ibiza International Film Festival, for his work in Rebels Without a Clue.

Life and career
Barnett was born in Macclesfield, England, the son of Deborah, a chef, and Peter, who has his own building company. Rik Barnett attended City College Manchester formerly 'The Shena Simon Performing Arts School' in Manchester, where he earned distinctions in acting. He then attended the Lee Strasberg Theatre and Film Institute in Los Angeles. He has previously acted for ITV and Ealing Studios. In 2012, he graduated from his acting program at UCLA.

In 2010, Barnett worked on the Independent film Rebels Without A Clue, working alongside such actors as Doctor Who's John Leeson. It was his work in this film that earned him the Best Supporting Actor award at Ibiza International Film Festival, some of the former recipients of this award have been Enrique Murciano and Alfred Molina. Actress Jacqueline Bisset who was Jury President along with Carlos Bardem presented the award.

Rebels Without A Clue was also nominated for Best UK Feature at Raindance Film Festival, showing at Apollo Cinema: Piccadilly Circus, and was screened during Cannes Film Festival.

One reviewer reported that Barnett's performance was "glorious to watch", another said that "Barnett, who plays Mark, (or 'wanker', as he is affectionately referred to throughout) is able to switch seamlessly between the genuinely touching dialogue about his father to keeping up with dim-witted banter".

In September 2012 Barnett was featured on the cover of the Thai lifestyle magazine OUT In Thailand.

In 2013 Barnett worked alongside filmmaker Jonathan Sheldon on the "Fifty Shades of Grey Gardens" spoof for Funny or Die Currently he is working on his own play 'Bosie'. He is also a monthly contributor to Prodijee, an Australian magazine.

Personal life
It was reported in a 26 May 2012 story in the Omaha World-Herald newspaper, that Barnett was engaged to be married to Tony Award-winning Broadway producer Adam Epstein, one of the producers of the original Broadway musical production of Hairspray.

Barnett uses swimming to manage stress, to focus and to learn his lines.

List of credits

Films

Theatre

Radio and commercial

New Media

References

External links

Ibiza Sun interview
Official Website
OUT In Thailand Profile
SwimSwam Interview 2016

1989 births
English male child actors
English male film actors
English male television actors
Lee Strasberg Theatre and Film Institute alumni
Living people
People from Macclesfield
Actors from Cheshire
LGBT male actors
English LGBT actors